Gilles Blaser (born 16 December 1952) is a Swiss former racing cyclist. He most notably won a silver medal in the elite race at the 1979 UCI Cyclo-cross World Championships and the Ziklokross Igorre in 1982. He also finished second to Albert Zweifel at the Swiss National Cyclo-cross Championships in 1984 and 1985.

References

External links

1952 births
Living people
Swiss male cyclists
Cyclo-cross cyclists